The 2019–20 Biathlon World Cup – Stage 1 was the opening event of the season and was held in Östersund, Sweden, from 30 November to 8 December 2019.

Schedule of events 
The events took place at the following times.

Podium results

Men

Women

Mixed

References 

Biathlon World Cup - Stage 1, 2019-20
2019–20 Biathlon World Cup
Biathlon World Cup - Stage 1
Biathlon World Cup - Stage 1
Biathlon competitions in Sweden
Sports competitions in Östersund